The Shaheedan Misl was one of twelve Sikh Misls that later became the Sikh Empire. It held a small amount of territory in the Malwa (Punjab) area around the Damdama Sahib before being incorporated into the Sikh Empire of the Sukerchakia Misl by Ranjit Singh.

Deep Singh (later Baba Deep Singh), son of Bhagta, of village Pahuwind (now district Amritsar) was the founder of this Misl. Earlier this Misl was known as Deep Singh’s Misl but after the martyrdom of Deep Singh in 1757 and another Sikh general Gurbakhsh Singh (of Leel village) in 1764, this Misl came to be known as Shaheedan Misl.

Origins and history
In 1748, Baba Deep Singh was appointed the leader of the Shaheedan Misl and the Mahant of the Takht Sri Damdama Sahib. In 1757, Ahmad Shah Abdali invaded India and sent an army to the Harmindar Sahib to block Sikhs from entering the Gurdwara. Baba Deep Singh and a company of men who rode with him to free the gurdwara were killed in the Battle of Amritsar (1757) against the Durrani Army. His successor, Suddha Singh, later led the misl into a skirmish against the Afghan government of Jalandhar City. The first two leaders of the misl were considered Shaheeds, or  martyrs, by their contemporaries so the misl became known as, Shaheedan Misl, or the followers of the martyrs. The misl was annexed by the Sikh Empire at some point in the early 19th century and became a part of the Sikh Empire. The Nihang order of Sikhs maintains the traditions of this misl.

Gallery

References 

Misls